Sâmia Raquel Passos Lima (born 8 June 2000) is a Brazilian badminton player. As a junior player, she won the U-17 2016 Pan Am Junior Badminton Championships in the girls' and mixed doubles event. She won her first senior international title at the Brazil International Challenge tournament partnered with Jaqueline Lima. She was a bronze medalist in the women's doubles event at the 2019 Lima Pan American Games.

Achievements

Pan American Games 
Women's doubles

Pan Am Championships 
Women's doubles

Pan Am Junior Championships 
Girls' doubles

Mixed doubles

BWF International Challenge/Series (9 titles, 8 runners-up) 
Women's singles

Women's doubles

Mixed doubles

  BWF International Challenge tournament
  BWF International Series tournament
  BWF Future Series tournament

References

External links 
 
 Confederação Brasileira de Badminton Atleta

Living people
2000 births
People from Teresina
Brazilian female badminton players
Badminton players at the 2019 Pan American Games
Pan American Games bronze medalists for Brazil
Pan American Games medalists in badminton
Medalists at the 2019 Pan American Games
Sportspeople from Piauí
21st-century Brazilian women